George Sayliss (March 3, 1931 – September 25, 2020) was a Canadian ice hockey player with the East York Lyndhursts. He won a silver medal at the 1954 World Ice Hockey Championships in Stockholm, Sweden. He also played with the Stratford Kroehlers.

References

1931 births
2020 deaths
Canadian ice hockey defencemen
East York Lyndhursts players